Maurico Ariel Caranta (born 31 July 1978 in Bell Ville, Córdoba) is an Argentine former professional football goalkeeper.

Career
Caranta started his career with Instituto de Córdoba in 1999. He helped Instituto to win the Primera B Nacional Apertura in the  2003–04 season and promotion to the Primera División at the end of the 2003–04 season. He made a total of 139 league appearances for Instituto.

In 2005, he moved to Mexican club Santos Laguna, where he made 47 league appearances before returning to Argentina to sign for Boca Juniors in 2007. He made his debut for Boca on 10 February 2007 in a 4-0 victory over Club Atlético Banfield. He was the first-choice goalkeeper in the 2007 Copa Libertadores as Boca won the competition, beating Brazilian club Grêmio in the final in June 2007. In December 2007 he played in the 2007 FIFA Club World Cup, in which Boca reached the final where they lost 4-2 to Italian club A.C. Milan at the Nissan Stadium, Yokohama, Japan on 16 December 2007.

In August 2008 he played in both legs of the 2008 Recopa Sudamericana final, which Boca won 5-3 on aggregate against Arsenal de Sarandí.

Following the completion of the Torneo Apertura 2008 team won the gold and blue, the conflict with his club's goalkeeper was aggravated because Caranta tried to leave the club and could not reach any agreement to be released or transferred. Finally, after much back and forth, on March 26, 2009 he signed for Lanús.

Honours

References

External links
 
 Argentine Primera statistics at Fútbol XXI  
 Football lineups player profile
 

1978 births
Living people
Sportspeople from Córdoba Province, Argentina
Argentine footballers
Argentine expatriate footballers
Instituto footballers
Santos Laguna footballers
Boca Juniors footballers
Club Atlético Lanús footballers
Rosario Central footballers
Talleres de Córdoba footballers
Argentine Primera División players
Primera Nacional players
Liga MX players
Expatriate footballers in Mexico
Association football goalkeepers